Marinovich is a surname found in Croatian diaspora, an anglicization of Marinović.

Notable people with the name include:

 Greg Marinovich (born 1962), South African photojournalist, film maker and photo editor
 Marv Marinovich (1939–2020), American football player and sports trainer
 Todd Marinovich (born 1969), American and Canadian football player